Condicinae is a subfamily of moths in the family Noctuidae. The subfamily was erected by Robert W. Poole in 1995.

Tribes and genera
Condicini Poole, 1995
Prospalta Walker, [1858]
Chytonix Grote, 1874
Niphonyx Sugi in Inoue, Sugi, Kuroko, Moriuti & Kawabe, 1982
Oligonyx Sugi in Inoue, Sugi, Kuroko, Moriuti & Kawabe, 1982
Pyrrhidivalva Sugi in Inoue, Sugi, Kuroko, Moriuti & Kawabe, 1982
Dysmilichia Speiser, 1902
Plusilla Staudinger, 1892
Condica Walker, 1856
Hadjina Staudinger, [1892]
Acosmetia Stephens, 1829
Homophoberia Morrison, 1875
Ogdoconta Butler, 1891
Perigea Guenée in Boisduval & Guenée, 1852
Bagada Walker, 1858
Stibaera Walker, 1857
Leuconyctini Poole, 1995
Eucarta Lederer, 1857
Kenrickodes Viette, 1961
Crambodes Guenée in Boisduval & Guenée, 1852
Leuconycta Hampson, 1909
Fotella Grote, 1882
Diastema Guenée in Boisduval & Guenée, 1852
Micrathetis Hampson, 1908
Tribe unassigned
Aleptina Dyar, 1902
Hemicephalis Möschler, 1890

References

 
Noctuidae